Xihuan Road Station is a station of Line 1, Suzhou Rail Transit. The station is located in Gusu District of Suzhou. It has been in use since April 28, 2012, the same time of the operation of Line 1.

Station

Accessible Information
 Xihuan Lu Station is a fully accessible station, this station equipped with wheelchair accessible elevators, blind paths with bumps, and wheelchair ramps. These facilities can help people with disabilities, seniors, youths, and pregnancies travel through Suzhou Rail Transit system.

Station configurations
L1 (First Floor/Street Level): Entrances/Exits (stairs and escalators); and elevators with wheelchair accessible ramps.

B1 (Mezzanine/Station Hall Level): Station Control Room; Customer Service; Automatic Ticket Vending Machines; Automatic Fee Collection Systems with turnstiles; stairs and escalators; and elevators with wheelchair accessible ramps.

B2 (Platform Level): Platform; toilet; stairs and escalators; elevators with wheelchair accessible ramps.

Station layout

First & Last Trains

Exits Information
Exit 2: South-East Corner of Xihuan Lu and Ganjiang Xilu

Exit 3: North-East Corner of Xihuan Lu and Ganjiang Xilu

Exit 4: North-West Corner of Xihuan Lu and Ganjiang Xilu

Local Attractions
SanYuan YiCun
SanYuan ErCun
SanYuan SanCun
SanYuan SiCun
BinHe Merchants Building
SanYuan Building
BaiLian Garden
Suzhou SanYuan Middle School (Branch School of Suzhou No.1 Middle School)
Canal Park
Thermo-technical Research Institute

Bus Connections
Bus Stop: Xinlian Qiao - Connection Bus Routes: 9, 60, 64, 332, 333, 333 LongChi Special Line, 935

Bus Stop: SanYuan XinCun - Connection Bus Routes: 9,10, 306,332, 931, 935, BRT 8

Bus Stop: ShiSHanQiao Dong - Connection Bus Routes: 10, 60, 64, 306, 333, 333 KongChi Special Line, 931, BRT 8

References

Railway stations in Jiangsu
Suzhou Rail Transit stations
Railway stations in China opened in 2012